North Babar is an Austronesian language spoken on the north coast of Babar Island in South Maluku, Indonesia.

References 

Babar languages
Languages of the Maluku Islands